The Jalayirid  Sultanate was a Mongol Jalayir dynasty which ruled over Iraq and western Persia after the breakup of the Mongol khanate of Persia in the 1330s. It lasted about fifty years, until disrupted by Timur's conquests and the revolts of the Qara Qoyunlu Turkoman. After Timur's death in 1405, there was a brief attempt to re-establish the sultanate in southern Iraq and Khuzistan. The Jalayirids were finally eliminated by the Qara Qoyunlu in 1432.

The Jalayirids were Turkicized and Turkic-speaking. They are credited with bolstering the Turkic presence in Arabic-speaking Iraq so much so that Turkic became the second-most-spoken language after Arabic. The Jalayirids were also culturally Persianate, and their era marks an important period in the evolution of Persian art, where it developed important aspects that would serve as the basis of later Persian paintings.

History 
The history of the Sultanate of Jalayirid can be divided into four phases: 

 The first phase was during the early years when the dynasty was practically autonomous but theoretically accepted the authorization of the Ilkhanate state.
 The second phase, corresponding to the rule of Shaykh Uways Jalayir (1356–1374), is the peak of the Jalayerids.
 The third phase was a weakening period that began after the death of Uways.
 The fourth phase was when the country became exposed to external attacks by Timur and the Qara Qoyunlu and where the dynasty came to an end.

Early years 

During the disintegration years of the Ilkhanate after the death of Abu Sa'id Bahadur Khan in 1335, the family of emir Ilge (Īlgā) Noyan, known as Köke (Kukā, ‘Blue’) Ilge, descendants of the Jalayirid tribe, first emerged as the inheritors of the traditional governors of the southwestern lands of the Ilkhanate. Ilge Noyan had taken over pasturelands along the River Onon in Mongolia and produced several military commanders during the Mongol era. According to the Jami' al-tawarikh written by Rashid-al-Din Hamadani, Ilge, who accompanied Hulegu on his great expedition to Western Asia in the 1250s, was among the generals who besieged the Assassins' strongholds in Qohestan in 1256. Besides, Ilge joined the expedition to Baghdad and was tasked with overseeing the rebuilding of the city after its siege in 1258. Ilge Noyan served Hülegü until the khan's death in 1265. When the Abaka khan came to the throne in 1265 and was identified as a senior emir, Ilge was in charge of the ordos ("royal headquarters"). Ilge was one of the main military leaders in conflicts with the Mamluks and Jochids, neighbors and opponents of the Ilkhanate, in Baghdad, Syria, Diyarbakir and the Caucasus.
 
Ilge Noyan's sons Agbuga (Āqbuqā), Tughu were also in the service of Abaga khan. Agbuga, who was promoted to mir-e mirān (commander-in-chief) by Keyhatu khan, was later assassinated by Baydu's supporters in 1295. He became the patron (murabbī) of Sadr al-Din Zanjani, Kaykhatu's grand vizier. Aq buqa was married to Qhazan khan's sister Ūljatāy Sulṭān, but after his death, his son Hussein married his father's wife and took the title of gūrgān (greregen) or royal son-in-law.

Hussein first served Oljaitu and then Abu Sa'id, and took part in the march on Gilan in 1317. He was later appointed ruler of Arran in 1313 and died in Khorasan in 1322. After his death, his son Shaykh Hasan ("Hasan Buzurg", "Hasan The Great") became the head of the family. He was both the cousin of Abu Sa'id and the nephew of Amir Choban.

After defeating his rivals, Hasan Buzurg strengthened his ties with Muhammad Khan (Pir Hussein), who ruled Anatolia at the time. He then proceeded to Tabriz where he put Muhammad on the throne and married the granddaughter of Chupan and the wife of Abu Sa'id, Dilshad Khatun. Shaykh Ḥasan was the ‘biklārī bik [beglerbeg], or amīr al-umarā’’.

For a short time in 1337–1338, Hasan Buzurg-un's authority was recognized in all parts of the Ilkhanate Empire except Khorasan, but after being expelled by Ḥasan-e Kucak and his brother Malek Ašraf in 1338–1339, he was forced to evacuate Azerbaijan and his power only held in Iraq. Hasan Buzurg died in July 1356 and was buried in Najaf. He was succeeded by his son, Shaikh Uways Jalayir.

Shaykh Uways period 

According to historian Patrick Wing, while the Jalayirid sultans sought to preserve the social and political order of the Ilkhanate, they claimed to be the legitimate heirs of the rule of this order. At the center of the claims of the Jalayirid regarding the Ilkhanid heritage was their attempt to control Azerbaijan, the main center of the Ilkhanate. This province represented the symbolic heritage and material wealth of the Ilkhanate and became the focus of the Jalayirid political program.

Shortly after Shaykh Uways Jalayir succeeded his father, the old enemy of the Jalayirids, the Chobanids, were overrun by the forces of the Golden Horde under Jani Beg in 1357. Malek Asraf was executed, and Azerbaijan was conquered.

Following Jani Beg's withdrawal from Azerbaijan, as well as his son Berdi Beg’s similar abandonment of the region in 1358, the area became a prime target for its neighbors. Shaykh Uways Jalayir, who at first had recognized the sovereignty of the Blue Horde, decided to take the former Chobanid lands for himself, even as a former amir of Malek Asraf’s named Akhichuq attempted to keep the region in Mongol hands. Despite a campaign that ended prematurely, as well as the brief conquest of Azerbaijan by the Muzaffarids, Uvais conquered the area in 1360. In addition to Baghdad, he could now boast Tabriz as a large city under his control.

In 1364, Shaykh Uways Jalayir campaigned against the Shirvan Shah Kai-Ka’us, but a revolt begun by the governor of Baghdad, Khwaja Mirjan, forced him to return to reassert his authority. In 1366, Shaykh Uways Jalayir marched against the Kara Koyunlu, defeating their leader, Bairam Khwaja, at the battle of Mush. Later, he defeated the Shirvanshah, who had attacked Tabriz twice in the meantime. According to Zayn al- Dīn Qazvīnī and Ḥāfiẓ Abrū, Kā’ūs readily overpowered all of Shirvan and Darband for Shaykh Uways Jalayir, and remained a faithful servant as long as he lived. After the death of Kā’ūs, Shaykh Uways Jalayir confirmed his son, Hūshang, as the successor of Shirvanshahs.

Due to his campaigns, Shaykh Uways Jalayir spent much time in Iran, and he died in Tabriz in 1374. During his lifetime, the Jalayirid state reached its peak in power. In addition to his military adventures, which were considerable, he was known for his attempts to revive commercial enterprise, which had suffered heavily in the past years, in the region, as well as his patronage to the arts. His chronicler, Abu Bakr al-Qutbi al Ahri, wrote of Shaykh Uways Jalayir’ deeds in the Tarikh-i Shaikh Uvais. Shaykh Uways Jalayir was succeeded by his son Shaikh Hasan Jalayir. He appointed his son Hassan as his successor in Baghdad. After his death the power of the dynasty began to disappear sharply.

Decline 
In 1376, Shaikh Hussain Jalayir took up residence in Tabriz. In the following spring, he undertook a successful campaign against the Kara Koyunlu under Bayram Khwaja, who had been raiding from the west. Shaikh Hussain Jalayir lost his supporters because of the external enemies and conflicts within the amirs. His brother Sultan Ahmad Jalayir came to power as a result of a plot against him. Ahmad's other brothers, Shaikh 'Ali and Bayazid opposed him. To secure his position, Ahmad requested the assistance of the Kara Koyunlu. Shaikh 'Ali fell in battle against the Kara Koyunlu.

In the spring of 1384, the Chagatai amir Timur attacked the Jalayirids and Azerbaijan. Although Sultan Ahmad was not captured, his subordinates in Soltaniyeh failed to defend the town and Timur took it with a minimum of resistance.

In the midst of Timur's absence, Sultan Ahmad had to deal with an invasion by Tokhtamysh, Khan of the Golden Horde in 1385. 

Timur completed his Indian campaign and returned to Azerbaijan in 1396. Kara Koyunlu ruler Kara Yusuf, who retreated to Mosul to avoid a sudden raid, was able to take shelter in the Ottomans in 1400.

The hosting of Yildirim Bayezid to Kara Yusuf was one of the main reasons Timur launched a campaign against the Ottomans. He was able to reach Damascus by escaping into the desert. Kara Yusuf was welcomed by Sheikh Mahmud, the nâib of Damascus. Not long after, Jalairid Sultan Ahmed also came to Damascus. Not wanting to worsen relations with Amir Teymur, Nasir-ad-Din Faraj agreed to capture Gara Yusif and Sultan Ahmed Jalairi, and hand them over to Teymur. Sultan Ahmed Jalayir and Kara Yusuf imprisoned on the order of Nasir-ad-Din Faraj. Together in prison, the two leaders renewed their friendship, making an agreement that Sultan Ahmed Jalayir should keep Baghdad while Qara Yusuf would have Azerbaijan. Ahmad also adopted his son Pirbudag. When Timur died in 1405 Nasir-ad-Din Faraj released them both. However, according to Faruk Sümer, they were released on the orders of rebellious wali of Damascus - Sheykh Mahmud.

In 1409 fall, Qara Yusuf entered Tabriz and sent a raiding party to Shirvan, especially Shaki, which was fruitless. Kara Koyunlu defeated Jalayirds in 1432, bringing an end to the dynasty.

Government

The Jalayirid administration was modeled after Ilkhanate protocols, with documents in Persian and Mongolian. Its diplomatic correspondence also resembled the Ilkhanate's, using a red ink square seal with Islamic phrases in Arabic.

Rulers

Family tree

See also

Chupanids
Mongol invasions of Azerbaijan

References

Sources
 
 
 

1432 disestablishments in Asia
States and territories established in 1335
 
Mongol states
1335 establishments in Asia
1330s in the Middle East